"Fuck and Run" is the tenth track on the album Exile in Guyville by American singer-songwriter Liz Phair.

Background and Recording
According to a 2018 interview with Elle.com, Phair stated: "there was no one encounter that I went home and just wrote the song about". In 1991, Phair recorded a demo of "Fuck and Run" and received immediate positive feedback from fans, however, a majority of the feedback was from male fans misinterpreting the song as being pro-sex instead of being about a woman's perspective wanting commitment.

In 1993, Phair re-recorded "Fuck and Run" for her debut album Exile in Guyville. While the album's title itself is a parody of The Rolling Stones album Exile on Main St., Exile on Main St. was very much an influence on Phair while recording the final album version of "Fuck and Run".

Later Performances

Phair continues to perform this song live, including a version performed at Planned Parenthood in 2017 that went viral.

References

Songs written by Liz Phair
1993 songs
Liz Phair songs